Brasilennea minor is a fossil species of air-breathing land snail, a terrestrial pulmonate gastropod mollusk in the family Cerionidae, from the Paleocene Itaboraí Basin, Brazil. Brasilennea minor is the smallest species in the genus Brasilennea; it was originally described as a smaller variant of Brasilennea arethusae (as reflected by its specific epithet), but was later raised to the rank of species.

References

Cerionidae
Paleocene gastropods
Gastropods described in 1956